Goniocranion is an extinct genus of prehistoric bony fish that lived during the lower Eocene.

See also

 Prehistoric fish
 List of prehistoric bony fish

References

Prehistoric perciform genera
Eocene fish
Paleogene animals of Europe